The Duchy of Pomerania-Wolgast, also known as the Duchy of Wolgast, and the Duchy of Wołogoszcz, was a feudal duchy in Western Pomerania within the Holy Roman Empire. Its capital was Wolgast. It was ruled by the Griffin dynasty. It existed in the Late Middle Ages era from 1295 to 1478.

The state was formed in 1160, in the partition of the Duchy of Pomerania, with duke Bogislaw IV, as its first ruler. In 1478, the state was incorporated into the re-unified Duchy of Pomerania, under the rule of duke Bogislaw X. During its existence, part of its territory was partitioned into Pomerania-Stolp (1368), Pomerania-Neustettin (1368), Pomerania-Barth (1376), and Pomerania-Stargard (1377).

Symbols 
The coat of arms of the duchy was the escutcheon separated into two halves, with the upper half being red, and lower half, a blue and yellow (gold) checker. In the upper half is placed white (silver) upper half of a Griffin. It was originally the coat of arms of the Bernstein Land.

List of rulers 
 Bogislaw IV (1295–1309)
 Wartislaw IV (1309–1326)
 Bogislaw V, Wartislaw V, and Barnim IV (1326–1365)
 Bogislaw V and Wartislaw V (1365–1368)
 Bogislaw VI and Wartislaw VI (1368–1376)
 Bogislaw VI (1376–1393)
 Wartislaw VI (1393–1394)
 Barnim VI (1394–1405)
 Barnim VII and Wartislaw IX (1405–1451)
 Wartislaw IX (1451–1457)
 Eric II (1457–1474)
 Wartislaw X (1474–1478)

Citations

Notes

References

Bibliography 
Rodowód książąt pomorskich by E. Rymar. Szczecin. Pomeranian Library. 2005. ISBN 83-87879-50-9, OCLC 69296056. (Polish)
Źródła do kaszubsko-polskich aspektów Pomorza Zachodniego do roku 1945, vol. 1 by B. Wachowiak, in Pomorze Zachodnie pod rządami książąt plemiennych i władców z dynastii Gryfitów: (990-1121-1637-1648/1653) by Z. Szultka. Polska Akademia Nauk, Instytut Historii im. Tadeusza Manteuffla, Wydawnictwo Poznańskie, Zrzeszenie Kaszubsko-Pomorskie, Poznań–Gdańsk. 2006. ISBN 83-7177-459-1. (Polish)
Gryfici. Książęta Pomorza Zachodniego by K. Kozłowski and J. Podralski. Szczecin. Krajowa Agencja Wydawnicza. 1985. ISBN 83-03-00530-8, OCLC 189424372. (Polish)
 Zdzisław Machura, O Księżnych i Książętach znanych z historii miasta Słupska: publikacja wydana z okazji X Jubileuszowego Jarmarku Gryfitów.
Werner Buchholz, Pommern, Siedler, 1999, .
Oliver Auge, Die pommerschen Greifen als Fürsten von Rügen und Herzöge von Barth, in: Melanie Ehler, Matthias Müller (eds.), Unter fürstlichem Regiment. Barth als Residenz der pommerschen Herzöge, Lukas Verlag, Berlin, 2005, ISBN 3-936872-55-4.
Encyklopedia Szczecina, vol. 1. A-O. Szczecin. University of Szczecin. 1999. p. 336. ISBN 83-87341-45-2.

 Former countries in Europe
 Former monarchies of Europe
 Duchies of the Holy Roman Empire
Wolgast
 13th-century establishments in Europe
 15th-century disestablishments in Europe
 13th century in the Holy Roman Empire
 14th century in the Holy Roman Empire
 15th century in the Holy Roman Empire
 States and territories established in 1295
 States and territories disestablished in 1478